Vitalia Diatchenko was the defending champion, but chose not to participate.

Marina Melnikova won the title, defeating Stéphanie Foretz in the final, 6–3, 7–6(8–6).

Seeds

Main draw

Finals

Top half

Bottom half

External Links
 Main draw

Aegon Surbiton Trophy - Singles
Aegon Surbiton Trophy